A directorial republic is a country ruled by a college of several people who jointly exercise the powers of a head of state and/or a head of government.

In political history, the term directory, in French , is applied to high collegial institutions of state composed of members styled director. The most important of these by far was the Directory of 1795–1799 in France. The system was inspired by the Pennsylvania Constitution of 1776, which prominently featured a collegial 12-member Supreme Executive Council with a primus inter pares President. Variants of this form of government, based on the French model, were also established in the European regions conquered by France during the French Revolutionary Wars.

In the past, Uruguay, Yugoslavia (after 1974), Ukraine (1918), Bohemian Revolt (1618-1620) and other countries were ruled by directories.

One country now using this form of government is Switzerland (and to a lesser extent, San Marino), where directories rule all levels of administration, federal, cantonal and municipal. The Swiss Federal Council is elected by the Federal Assembly for four years, and is composed of seven members, among whom one is president and one is vice-president on a rotating basis, although these positions are symbolic in normal circumstances. The directories can be directly elected by voters.

Examples

Current
 : Federal Council and equivalent executives of each canton
 : Captains Regent
 : Presidency of Bosnia and Herzegovina
 : European Council and European Commission

Former
  New England Confederation
 : Supreme Executive Council 
 : French Directory
 : The Town's Legates Junta and High Government Junta
 : Directorate of Ukraine
 : Collective leadership in the Soviet Union
 : National Council of Administration and National Council of Government
 : Presidency of Yugoslavia
 : Junta of National Reconstruction

See also
 Politics of Switzerland
 Politics of San Marino
 Government of Switzerland
 Government of San Marino
 Executive (government)
 Collegiality

References

Republic
Collective heads of state
Power sharing